Dudullu is an underground station on the M5 line of the Istanbul Metro in Ümraniye. The station is located on Alemdağ Street in the Yukarı Dudullu neighborhood of Ümraniye. Connection to IETT city buses is available from at street level.

The M5 line operates as fully automatic unattended train operation (UTO). The station consists of an island platform with two tracks. Since the M5 is an ATO line, protective gates on each side of the platform open only when a train is in the station.

The platform of the M8 line is under the platform of the M5 line.

M5 Dudullu station was opened on 21 October 2018.

M8 Dudullu station was opened on 6 January 2023.

Station layout 
The station has 2 exits. There are 3 elevators and 18 escalators.

Under construction

References

External links 

 Official Website of Istanbul Metro (in English)

Railway stations opened in 2018
Istanbul metro stations
Ümraniye
2018 establishments in Turkey